Roll, Freddy, Roll! is a 1974 American TV comedy film directed by Bill Persky.

Synopsis 
Freddy is a computer engineer working at Menlo Computer Machine. His secretary notifies him that his ex-wife had a whirlwind romance with flamboyant, successful used car dealer Big Sid and is marrying him in days. Freddy agrees to take in Tommy, his eight-year-old son, while they're on their honeymoon. He meets them at Sid's opulent mansion, where he also meets Sid's attractive daughter, Sidni.

Tommy comes to idolize Big Sid for his wealth, while the low-key Freddie feels inadequate and fumes. Mr. Menlo is depending on Freddy to convince Admiral Norton to buy a $10 million mainframe computer, but the gung-ho officer is unimpressed by computers. Freddy's co-worker Don hatches a plan to use the computer to predict football game results that will allow Norton to win his betting pool. It succeeds, and Freddy uses his newfound connection with the admiral to request a visit to a navy ship for himself and Tommy.

Big Sid lands a world-record bluefin tuna while fishing on his honeymoon, which Freddy resents even more. Sid returns early with an idea to run an event on his car lot where people can try to break records of all types. Freddy and Tommy's visit to the USS Enterprise is cancelled as the aircraft carrier is delayed at sea by bad weather, so he takes Tommy to a roller skating rink. Tommy would rather go to Big Sid's record event and Freddy finally acquiesces. But the rink has lost his shoes. When the rink's owner questions whether Freddy came in wearing shoes, an exasperated Freddy leaves wearing the skates, vowing not to return them until he gets his shoes back.

At Big Sid's, a news crew mistakes Freddy for one of the record-seekers and interviews him. Freddy calls the rink and finds out they have recovered his shoes. As he's about to change out of his skates, he sees his interview on the snack bar television. Other customers are impressed and wish him luck, which makes him think he can impress Tommy with the record. He returns the shoes, promising to pick them up after he has broken the endurance record in another 142 hours.

Driving home, his skates jam on the pedals and he's stopped by a police officer, who eventually comes to understand and drives him the rest of the way. Without a car, he tells Tommy to take a taxi to go to his apartment. Sidni drives him instead and they have dinner together. Tommy is impressed by his dad's record attempt.

At Menlo, Freddy's co-workers are incredulous and Mr. Menlo is furious, especially as Freddy's skates mark his office floor. He gives Freddy an ultimatum to remove the skates, but after thinking it over, Freddy decides to stand up for himself and quits. He spends the next few days looking for a new job as well as skating everywhere. Admiral Norton calls Don, looking for the computer's predictions for the coming weekend. When told that Freddy has quit, he refuses to recommend the purchase. Mr. Menlo grudgingly re-hires Freddy, who demands a promotion to head of the research department. Freddy feigns an injury and uses a wheelchair to avoid being seen skating during the presentation to the admirals.

Immediately after the presentation, Freddy hastily skates to meet a news crew on the street to be certified for the record. His family watches on TV, reacting in horror as he helplessly rolls backward down a ramp at the end of the interview. After a madcap careen down hilly streets, he hits the side of a tour bus, ending up in a full body cast. Sidni informs him he has been given three world records: for the length of time on skates, for the highest speed on skates (over 70 mph) and for breaking the most bones in one accident, beating Evel Knievel's record.

Cast 
Tim Conway as Freddy Danton
Jan Murray as Big Sid Kane
Moosie Drier as Tommy Danton
Barra Grant as Sidni Kane
Scott Brady as Adm. Norton
Robert J. Hogan as Don Talbert
Ruta Lee as Evelyn Danton Kane
Henry Jones as Theodore Menlo
Danny Wells as Skating Rink Attendant
Edwina Gough as Rita
Sam Denoff as Gas Station Attendant
Richard Caine as Policeman
Richard Patterson as Ted Comden
Ed Peck as Adm. Frigate
Clifford A. Pellow as Guard
Roy West as Announcer L.A.
Patti Heider as Cashier
Richmond Shepard as Pogo Stick Champion
Diane Sommerfield as Helen
Wally Dalton as Counterman
Redmond Gleeson as Man

Soundtrack

See also
 List of American films of 1974

External links

1974 films
1974 comedy films
Roller skating films
Films scored by Jack Elliott
American comedy television films
ABC Movie of the Week
1970s English-language films
1970s American films